IFL Premier Division (Indonesian: Liga Futsal Indonesia Divisi Utama) is the official main competition for professional futsal clubs in Indonesia. It is organized by PSSI (Football Association of Indonesia).

Participating clubs in 2011

Futsal Kota Depok (West Java)
Putra Melayu
Borneo Nusantara (Kalimantan)
Mitre Putra Melayu
Poltek LP3I Medan (North Sumatra)
Gen B. Bandung (West Java)

References

External links
Official Website

Futsal leagues in Indonesia
2011 establishments in Indonesia
Sports leagues established in 2011

id:Liga Futsal Indonesia